Chris Engen may refer to:

 Chris Engen (actor), actor (The Young and the Restless)  
 Chris Summers (drummer), real name Christer Engen, Norwegian drummer (Turbonegro)